The Municipality of Šmartno ob Paki is a municipality in the traditional region of Styria in northeastern Slovenia. The seat of the municipality is the town of Šmartno ob Paki. Šmartno ob Paki became a municipality in 1994.

Settlements
In addition to the municipal seat of Šmartno ob Paki, the municipality also includes the following settlements:

 Gavce
 Gorenje
 Mali Vrh
 Paška Vas
 Podgora
 Rečica ob Paki
 Skorno
 Slatina
 Veliki Vrh

References

External links

Municipality of Šmartno ob Paki on Geopedia
Municipality of Šmartno ob Paki website

Smartno ob Paki
1994 establishments in Slovenia